Parastesilea is a genus of longhorn beetles of the subfamily Lamiinae, containing the following species:

 Parastesilea alboscutellaris Breuning, 1968
 Parastesilea grisescens (Breuning, 1938)
 Parastesilea latefasciata (Breuning, 1938)
 Parastesilea scutellaris (Pascoe, 1865)

References

Pteropliini